The El Ali meteorite (also known as Nightfall) is a 15.2 ton (16,800 kg) meteorite that was known to the local population in Somalia for generations, but first scientifically identified in 2020.

Discovery and identification 
El Ali was found in a limestone valley 15 kilometres north of El Ali at GPS location 4°17.281’N, 44°53.893’E on September 2020. Local pastoralists were aware of the rock for between five and seven generations, and it featured in songs, folklore, dances, and poems. The meteorite was brought to the attention of the international community by Kureym Mining and Rocks Company's staff who were prospecting for opals in the area. They identified the rock and started moving it to Mogadishu before the Somalia government intervened.

It is an IAB meteorite.

Mineral identification 
In 2022, scientists from the University of Alberta identified two new minerals (elaliite and elkinstantonite) in a 70 gram piece of the meteorite. The minerals were identified by Andrew Locock, the head of the university's electron microprobe laboratory.

Synthetic versions of both minerals had previously been produced in a French laboratory in the 1980s, but International Mineralogical Association rules meant they could not be approved as an official mineral until they were found in a natural sample.

Curation 
The location of the main mass of the meteorite is uncertain; it was last recorded being shipped to China, presumably for sale. Small samples are held at the University of Arizona, the University of Alberta, and UC Los Angeles.

References

External links 
 Entry for El Ali in the Meteoritical Bulletin
 J.T. Wasson and G. W Kalleymeyn, the IAB iron-meteorite complex: A group, five subgroups, numerous grouplets, closely related, mainly formed by crystal segregation in rapidly cooling melts, Geochimica et Cosmochimica Acta, Volume 66, Issue 13, 1 July 2002, Pages 2445-2473

Meteorites by name